This is a list of notable Muslim writers and poets.

Writers and poets

A

  Arshadul Qadri ( indian) 
 Ahmed Raza Khan Barelvi  ( indian)
 Aamer Hussein (Pakistani)
 Abbas el-Akkad (Egyptian)
 Abdul Rahman Munif (Saudi)
 Abdullah Khan (Indian)
 Abdulah Sidran (Bosniak)
 Abid Azad (Bangladeshi)
 Abul Ala Maududi (Maulana Maududi) (Pakistani)
 Abul Hasan (Bangladeshi)
 Abu'l Hasan Mihyar al-Daylami (Persian)
 Abu Hena Mustafa Kamal (Bangladeshi)
 Abul Kalam Azad (Indian)
 Abu Nuwas (Arab Persian)
 Abu Tammam (Syrian Arab)
 Abu Zafar Obaidullah (Bangladeshi)
 Aga Shahid Ali (Kashmiri American)
 Ahmad Kutty (Indian American)
 Ahmad Ibn Arabshah (Syrian Arab)
 Ahmed Ali (Pakistani)
 Ahmed Sofa (Bangladesh)
 Ahsan Habib (Bangladeshi)
 Akbar S. Ahmed (Pakistani)
 Ayad Akhtar (Pakistani American)
 Akhtaruzzaman Elias (Bangladeshi)
 Alaol (modern-day Bangladeshi)
 Al-Hallaj (Persian Sufi)
 Al-Jahiz (Basra, Iraq)
 Al Mahmud (Poet, Bangladesh)
 Alamgir Hashmi (Pakistani)
 Aqeel-ul-Gharavi (Indian)
 Asma Gull Hasan (American)
 Azizul Haque (Indian)

B

 Bakhtiyar Vahabzadeh
 Bande Ali Mia (Bangladeshi)
 Basharat Peer (Kashmiri)
 Begum Rokeya (Bangladesh)
 Belal Muhammad (Bangladeshi)
 Bilkisu Funtuwa
 Boonaa Mohammed
 Brother Dash

D

 Dawud Wharnsby
 Dalia Mogahed
 Daniel Moore

E

 Enamul Karim Nirjhar (Bangladeshi)

F

 Ferdowsi
 Fareed Zakaria (Indian American)
 Faisal Kutty
 Farrukh Ahmed (Bangladeshi)
 Fatima Mernissi
 Fazal Shahabuddin (Bangladeshi)
 Fazlul Haque Amini
 Fazza

G

 G. Willow Wilson

 Ghalib
 Ghulam Azam (Bangladesh)
 Ghulam Mustafa Khan
 Ghulam Ahmad Parwez

H

 Hafiz
 Hafiz Rashid Khan (Bangladeshi)
 Hamdan bin Mohammed al Maktoum
 Hanifa Deen
 Hasan Hafizur Rahman (Bangladeshi)
 Hashim Amir Ali (Hyderabad, India)
 Helal Hafiz (Bangladeshi)
 Humayun Ahmed
 Humayun Azad (Bangladeshi)
 Humayun Kabir
 Huseyn Javid

I

 Ibn al-Nafis
 Imtiaz Dharker

J

 Jafar Jabbarly
 Jalaluddin Umri
 Jamila al-'Alayili
 Jasimuddin (Bangladeshi)
 Joel Hayward

K

 Kabir (Indian Sufi)
 Muhammad Mojlum Khan (Bangladesh-born British)
 Kan Chun (also known as Mohamad Omar)
 Kaykobad (Bangladesh)(also known as Kazem Ali Quereshi)
 Kazi Kader Newaj (Bangladesh)
 Kazi Nazrul Islam (Bangladesh)
 Khaled Hosseini (Afghan-American)
 Khondakar Ashraf Hossain (Bangladeshi)
 Khurram Murad (Pakistan)
 Khurshidbanu Natavan (Azerbaijan)
 Kyar Ba Nyein {Myanmar}

 Jamilah Kolocotronis (America)

L

 Leila Aboulela

M

 Maghfoor Ahmad Ajazi (India)
 Mahmoud Darwish
 Mak Dizdar
 Malique Ibrahim
 Marjan Naderi
 Marmaduke Pickthall
 Martin Lings
 Maryam Sullivan
 Maung Thaw Ka
 Mawlana Faizani
 May Ziadeh
 Meša Selimović
 Melody Moezzi
 Michael Wolfe
 Michael Muhammad Knight
 Minyoon Shah Inat (Nasarpur, Sindh, Pakistan)
 Mir Mosharraf Hossain
 Mirza Abul Fazl (Allahabad, India)
 Mirza Fatali Akhundov
 Mirza Alakbar Sabir
 Mizanur Rahman Sayed (Bangladesh)
 Mohja Kahf
 Mona Eltahawy
 Morteza Motahari
 Motiur Rahman Nizami (Bangladesh)
 Motiur Rahman Mollik (Bangladeshi)
 Mohammed Mozammel Haque (West Bengal India; 1860-1933)
 Mozid Mahmud (Bangladeshi)
 Mohammad Anwar Shopiani (India)
 Muhammad Asad (Leopold Weiss)
 Muhammad Asadullah Al-Ghalib (Bangladesh)
 Muhammed Fethullah Gulen
 Sir Muhammad Iqbal (British India)
 Murad Wilfred Hofmann
 Musa Ćazim Ćatić

N

 Naim Frashëri
 Na'ima B Robert
 Naguib Mahfouz (Nobel Prize in Literature, 1988)
 Ali Akbar Natiq
 Nezami Aruzi
 Nilima Ibrahim
 Nizami Ganjavi
 Nouman Ali Khan
 Nimah Ismail Nawwab

O

 Omar Khayyám
 Orhan Pamuk (Nobel Prize in Literature, 2006)

R

 Rajaa al-Sanea
 Ian Iqbal Rashid
 Ruqaiyyah Waris Maqsood
 Rumi
 Riaz Ahmed Gohar Shahi

S

 Sa'adi
 Saheb Qibla Fultali
 Saffarzadeh, Tahereh
 Safvet-beg Bašagić
 Shah Abdul Latif Bhittai (Sindh, Pakistan)
 Shah Ahmad Shafi
 Shah Muhammad Sagir (Bangladeshi)
 Shamsur Rahman (Bangladeshi)
 Shaheed Quaderi (Bangladeshi)
 Shahnaz Bashir (Kashmir)
 Shaikh Ayaz (Sindh, Pakistan)
 U Shwe Yoe (a Burmese Muslim named U Ba Ga Lay. He was also a cartoonist, actor, comedian and dancer.)
 Sikdar Aminul Haq (Bangladeshi)
 Soheib Bencheikh
 Stephen Schwartz
 Suhaiymah Manzoor-Khan (British spoken word poet, writer, and speaker)
 Sultan Bahoo (Sufi writer and poet from Punjab, Pakistan)
 Sufi Barkat Ali (Punjab, Pakistan)
 Syed Shamsul Huq (Bangladeshi)
 Syed Waliullah

T

 Taha Hussein (Egyptian)
 Tariq Rahman (Pakistan)

U

 Uzeyir Hajibeyov

Y

 Yahiya Emerick (North America)
 Yunus Emre 
 Yusuf al-Khal
 Yusuf Balasagun

Z

 Zaib-un-Nissa Hamidullah
 Zaid Shakir
 Zuko Džumhur

See also
Arabic poetry
Islamic architecture
Islamic art history
Islamic calligraphy
Islamic fiction
Islamic literature
Islamic music
Islamic pottery
List of Moroccan writers
List of Muslim painters
List of Muslims
List of people by belief

Islamic literature
Writers
Muslim
Muslim